Francisco Gárate Aranguren, SJ (3 February 1857 - 9 September 1929) was a Spanish Catholic professed religious of the Jesuit order. Aranguren served as an nurse after receiving his qualification in 1877 and became noted for his encouragement and his tender care to the needs of students in his care.

His health took a sharp decline from the age of 72 and continued until his death not long after. His funeral saw students place rosaries and crucifixes on his coffin for his posthumous blessing.
His reputation for personal holiness led to calls for his beatification cause to commence and Pope John Paul II beatified him on 6 October 1985 in Saint Peter's Square.

Life

Francisco Gárate Aranguren was born on 3 February 1857 in the Kingdom of Spain as the second of seven brothers to Francisco and Maria Aranguren. He was born near the basilica where Ignatius of Loyola was born.

At the age of fourteen he left his home for domestic work in a Catholic college that had just been opened. In 1874 he decided to become a Jesuit religious - though not an ordained priest - and so he and two companions travelled on foot to Poyanne in France to commence their novitiate. The group did this because the Spanish Jesuits were expelled in 1869 and had to open a branch in France.

The novice made his religious vows on 2 February 1876 and left the town on 29 October 1877 to be a sacristan and a nurse in the La Guardia college near the Atlantic Coast and close to the border of Portugal and spent a decade there. It was his first assigned task since he finished his novitiate in which he had 200 male students in his care. He made his final vows on 15 August 1887 (the Feast of the Assumption) and in late March 1888 was assigned to the Deusto college as a doorkeeper and sacristan. He remained in that post until his death. Two of his brothers followed his example and themselves became professed Jesuit brothers.

Aranguren tended to ill students with great care and kindness while being attentive to their needs. He offered consolation and encouragement to students and was a wellspring of advice for all. He was also noted for his methods of simple living in terms of his room and his clothes and it even extended to the foods that he consumed.

His health started to fail on 8 September 1920 when he began to suffer sharp abdominal pains following Mass. He agreed to remain in bed on the condition that he finish the remainder of his chores. He asked for the Viaticum that evening but his discomfort was so bad that a nurse called the doctor who had to operate on his blocked urethra. He had brief relief and despite the successful operation continued to decline.

Aranguren died on 9 September 1929 at 7:00am after receiving the last rites - as a coincidence it was the feast of the Jesuit Saint Peter Claver. Students made their rosaries and crucifixes touch his coffin at his funeral for his posthumous blessing. He was reburied in August 1946 and relocated in 1964.

Beatification

The beatification process opened in both Bilbao and Vitoria with an informative process spanning from 14 December 1939 to 29 July 1940 tasked with collating available documentation and witness testimonies attesting to his saintliness.

Theologians approved all of his writings as being in line with doctrine in a decree was issued on 13 February 1942. His writings were collated separate from other documents so it could be studied in depth.

These processes took place despite the fact that the Congregation of Rites - under Pope Pius XII - did not grant their formal approval to the cause until 26 February 1950 in a move that granted the late Jesuit with the posthumous title of Servant of God.

The apostolic diocesan process opened not long after this on 4 May 1951 and concluded its business on 22 December 1953. This was the last process which allowed for the C.O.R. to grant ratification to the processes on 16 February 1962.

On 11 February 1982 he was proclaimed to be Venerable after Pope John Paul II determined that the late Jesuit had lived a model Christian life of heroic virtue.

The miracle required for beatification was investigated in the diocese of its origin and was ratified on 15 April 1983. This allowed for the Congregation for the Causes of Saints to commence their own investigation into the alleged miracle in Rome. The consulting medical board approved it on 4 October 1984 while theologians followed suit on 31 January 1985. The C.C.S. approved it on 26 March 1985 while passing it to the pope for his approval; this was granted on 9 May 1985.

John Paul II beatified him on 6 October 1985.

See also

Catholic Church in Spain

References

External links
Hagiography Circle

1857 births
1929 deaths
19th-century venerated Christians
20th-century venerated Christians
20th-century Spanish Jesuits
Beatifications by Pope John Paul II
19th-century Spanish Jesuits
Male nurses
People from Azpeitia
Spanish beatified people
Beatified Jesuits
Venerated Catholics by Pope John Paul II
Basque Jesuits